The Crown Building is a historic 26-story, 416 foot mixed-use skyscraper at the southwest corner of 57th Street and Fifth Avenue in the Midtown Manhattan neighborhood of New York City. The lower levels contain retail space, while the upper levels formerly housed offices, but were converted to the luxury Aman New York hotel and residences in 2022. Constructed as the Heckscher Building in 1921, the structure was designed by Warren and Wetmore. It was historically one of the most expensive retail and office space locations in the United States and the hotel has the highest base rate of any hotel in the city.

History

The Heckscher Building was constructed by philanthropist August Heckscher, who had built his fortune from zinc and Manhattan real estate. It was designed by Warren and Wetmore and completed in 1921. Architect Charles A. Wetmore was an investing partner with Heckscher in the tower's construction. The building was one of New York's first major multi-use structures, with stores and showrooms on the lower levels and offices on the upper floors. It was also one of the first skyscrapers in the city whose stepped, setback design was regulated by the 1916 Zoning Resolution. The resolution had been passed after the 1915 construction of the Equitable Building  in Lower Manhattan, whose towering, vertical sheer walls blocked sunlight to much of the surrounding neighborhood.

The Museum of Modern Art opened in a rented six-room suite on the Heckscher Building's twelfth floor on November 8, 1929, just ten days after the Wall Street Crash of 1929. The museum remained there until 1932. When Rockefeller Center opened nearby in 1933, Heckscher blamed the developers for decreased demand at his building, and sued them for improper leasing methods. The suit never went to trial. However, Heckscher lost ownership of the building in 1938, after a four-year foreclosure process. In 1946, Charles F. Noyes and Joseph Durst bought the building. They sold it to Kenneth S. Keyes in 1950. In 1964, it was renamed the Genesco Building, when Genesco, which owned Bonwit Teller across the street, became a major tenant. In 1966, it was sold to Centurion Real Estate Inc..

The structure was purchased in 1981 by then President of the Philippines Ferdinand E. Marcos. Marcos used international companies to purchase the building secretly, also obtaining help from Ralph and Joseph Bernstein as well as Adnan Khashoggi. The name was changed to the Crown Building in 1983, after its crown-like look when illuminated at night.

The Crown Building was the focus of various lawsuits after the fall of the Marcos regime. Numerous parties, including the Philippine government, claimed rights to it. Lawsuits claimed that Marcos entered into various agreements for the building or purchased it with money that was not his. The parties involved agreed to sell the building and split the proceeds in excess of the $89 million mortgage.

In 1991, Bernard Spitzer and partners Marvin Winter and Jerome L. Greene acquired the building for $93.6 million. After Spitzer's death in 2014, his son, former Governor of New York Eliot Spitzer, and the Winter family took over the property. The building was scheduled for auction in late 2014, but Jeff Sutton's Wharton Properties and Sandeep Mathrani’s General Growth Properties stepped in prior to the auction and purchased the building for $1.75 billion, one of the largest deals in New York City real estate history.

In 2015, Michael Shvo and Russian billionaire Vladislav Doronin purchased the office portion of the building for $500 million. Shvo and Doronin announced plans to convert and redevelop their portion of the Crown Building into a luxury hotel and residences. General Growth Properties and Wharton Properties retained the retail portion of the building. 

Chief Executive Ermenegildo “Gildo” Zegna directly negotiated the lease with retail co-owner and deal-maker Jeff Sutton. The new Peter Marino-designed space opened on February 13, 2019.

In 2019, the $1.45 Billion conversion work on the upper levels was begun by Doronin's OKO Group, funded in part by a $750 million loan. The lower levels remained retail, while the rest of the building was converted to the luxury Aman New York hotel & residences, operated by Doronin's Aman Resorts. The hotel portion, on floors 7-14, contains 83 rooms, three restaurants and a spa. The residential portion, on floors 15-30, consists of 22 condominiums. The first units became available in early 2021. The hotel opened on August 11, 2022. Rooms start at $3200 a night, nearly triple the rate of its nearby competitors - The St. Regis, The Carlyle and The Plaza.

Current retail tenants
Bulgari
Ermenegildo Zegna
Mikimoto

See also
 Architecture of New York City
 Billionaires' Row (Manhattan)

References

External links
 
Aman New York official website

1921 establishments in New York City
57th Street (Manhattan)
Commercial buildings completed in 1921
Commercial buildings in Manhattan
Fifth Avenue
Midtown Manhattan